Pardaleodes xanthopeplus, the rare pathfinder skipper, is a butterfly in the family Hesperiidae. It is found in Ivory Coast, Ghana, eastern Nigeria, Cameroon, Gabon, the Republic of the Congo and the Central African Republic. The habitat consists of wetter forests.

References

Butterflies described in 1892
Erionotini
Butterflies of Africa